Johnny Cash at Folsom Prison is the first live album by American singer-songwriter Johnny Cash, released on Columbia Records on May 6, 1968. After his 1955 song "Folsom Prison Blues", Cash had been interested in recording a performance at a prison. His idea was put on hold until 1967, when personnel changes at Columbia Records put Bob Johnston in charge of producing Cash's material. Cash had recently controlled his drug abuse problems, and was looking to turn his career around after several years of limited commercial success. Backed by June Carter, Carl Perkins, and the Tennessee Three, Cash performed two shows at Folsom State Prison in California on January 13, 1968. The initial release of the album consists of 15 songs from the first show and two from the second.

Despite little initial investment by Columbia, Johnny Cash at Folsom Prison was a hit in the United States, reaching number one on the country charts and the top 15 of the national album chart. The lead single, a live version of "Folsom Prison Blues", was a top 40 hit, Cash's first since 1964's "Understand Your Man". At Folsom Prison received positive reviews and revitalized Cash's career, becoming the first in a series of live albums recorded at prisons that includes At San Quentin (1969), På Österåker (1973), and A Concert Behind Prison Walls (1976). The album was rereleased with additional tracks in 1999, a three-disc set in 2008, and a five LP box set with bonus rehearsals in 2018 for Record Store Day. It was certified triple platinum in 2003 for US sales exceeding 3.4 million.

Background
Johnny Cash became interested in Folsom State Prison, California, while serving in the United States Air Force Security Service. In 1953, his unit watched Crane Wilbur's 1951 film Inside the Walls of Folsom Prison. The film inspired Cash to write a song that reflected his perception of prison life. The result was "Folsom Prison Blues", Cash's second single on Sun Records. The song became popular among inmates, who would write to Cash, requesting him to perform at their prisons. Cash's first prison performance was at Huntsville State Prison in 1957. Satisfied by the favorable reception, he performed at several other prisons in the years leading up to the Folsom performance in 1968.

A few years after attaining commercial success from songs such as "I Walk the Line", "Understand Your Man", and "Ring of Fire", Cash's popularity waned. This was due in part to his increasing dependence on drugs. In 1967, Cash sought help for his escalating drug problems; by the end of the year, his drug use decreased and he sought to turn his career around. Concurrently, the country portion of Columbia Records underwent major personnel changes. Frank Jones and Don Law, who had produced several of Cash's albums, were ousted in favor of Bob Johnston, who was known for his erratic behavior and willingness to disagree with studio executives. Cash saw this as an opportunity to pitch his idea of recording a live album at a prison; Johnston enthusiastically supported the concept. Johnston called San Quentin State Prison and Folsom, with Folsom being the first to respond.

Recording

On January 10, 1968, Cash and June Carter checked into the El Rancho Motel in Sacramento, California. They were later accompanied by the Tennessee Three, Carl Perkins, the Statler Brothers, Johnny's father Ray Cash, Reverend Floyd Gressett, pastor of Avenue Community Church in Ventura, California (where Cash often attended services), who counseled inmates at Folsom and helped facilitate the concert, and producer Johnston. The performers rehearsed for two days, an uncommon occurrence for them, sometimes with two or more songs rehearsed concurrently by various combinations of musicians. During the rehearsal sessions on January 12, California governor Ronald Reagan, who was at the hotel for an after-dinner speech, visited the band and offered his encouragement. One focus of the sessions was to learn "Greystone Chapel", a song written by inmate Glen Sherley. Sherley recorded a version of the song, which he passed on to Rev. Gressett via the prison's recreation director. On January 13, the group traveled to Folsom, meeting Los Angeles Times writer Robert Hilburn and Columbia photographer Jim Marshall, who were hired to document the album for the liner notes.

Cash decided to hold two performances on January 13, one at 9:40 am and one at 12:40 pm, in case the first performance was unsatisfactory. After an introduction by MC Hugh Cherry, who encouraged the prisoners to "respond" to Cash's performance, Carl Perkins took the stage and performed his hit song "Blue Suede Shoes". Following this song, the Statler Brothers sang their hit "Flowers on the Wall" and the country standard "This Old House". Cherry returned to the stage and instructed the inmates not to cheer for Cash until he introduced himself; they obliged. Waiting for the introduction would be the start of the Cash biopic Walk The Line which was released in 2005.

Cash opened both shows with a rendition of "Folsom Prison Blues", followed by many songs about prison, including "The Wall", "Green, Green Grass of Home", and the gallows humor song "25 Minutes to Go". Cash also included other songs of despair, such as the Merle Travis song "Dark as a Dungeon". Following "Orange Blossom Special", Cash included a few "slow, ballad-type songs", including "Send a Picture of Mother" and "The Long Black Veil", followed by three novelty songs from his album Everybody Loves a Nut: "Dirty Old Egg-Sucking Dog", "Flushed from the Bathroom of Your Heart", and "Joe Bean". June Carter joined Cash to perform a pair of duets. After a seven-minute version of a song from his Blood, Sweat and Tears album, "The Legend of John Henry's Hammer", Cash took a break and Carter recited a poem. Cash ended both concerts with Sherley's "Greystone Chapel". The second concert was not as fruitful as the first; the musicians were fatigued from the earlier show. Only two songs from the second concert, "Give My Love to Rose" and "I Got Stripes", made it onto the LP release.

Reception and impact

The album release of At Folsom Prison was prepared in four months. Despite the recent success of "Rosanna's Going Wild", a Cash single released just before the Folsom concerts that reached number two on the country charts, Columbia initially invested little in the album or its single "Folsom Prison Blues". This was due partially to Columbia's focusing its promotional efforts on pop stars rather than country artists. Nevertheless, the single charted on the Billboard Hot 100 on May 25, 1968; it also hit the country charts a week later. The single suffered a setback when Sirhan Sirhan assassinated Senator Robert F. Kennedy on June 5, 1968. Radio stations ceased playing the single due to the macabre line: "I shot a man in Reno / Just to watch him die". Reeling in the success prior to the assassination, Columbia demanded Johnston remix the single with the line removed. Despite protests from Cash, the single was edited and re-released. The new version became a success, reaching number one on the country charts and the top forty on the national charts. The single prompted the album to climb the album charts, eventually reaching number one on the Top Country Albums chart and number thirteen on the Pop Albums chart—the forerunner to the Billboard 200. By August 1968, Folsom had shipped over 300,000 copies; two months later it was certified gold by the Recording Industry Association of America (RIAA) for shipping over 500,000.

At Folsom Prison received rave reviews. Al Aronowitz of Life stated Cash sang the songs like "someone who has grown up believing he is one of the people that these songs are about." For The Village Voice, Ann Fisher wrote that "every cut is special in its own way" and Richard Goldstein noted the album was "filled with the kind of emotionalism you seldom find in rock." Fredrick E. Danker of Sing Out! praised At Folsom Prison as "an album structured an aural experience for us".

The success of At Folsom Prison revitalized Cash's career; according to Cash, "that's where things really got started for me again". Sun Records re-dubbed Cash's previous B-side "Get Rhythm" with applause similar to Folsom's, and it became successful enough to enter the Hot 100. Cash returned to the prison scene in 1969 when he recorded At San Quentin at San Quentin State Prison. At San Quentin became Cash's first album to hit number one on the Pop chart and produced the number two hit "A Boy Named Sue". The ensuing popularity from the Folsom concert also prompted ABC to give Cash his own television show.

The album was re-released on October 19, 1999, with three extra tracks excluded from the original LP: "Busted", "Joe Bean", and "The Legend of John Henry's Hammer". Stephen Thomas Erlewine of AllMusic praised the new version, calling it "the ideal blend of mythmaking and gritty reality." On May 27, 2003, At Folsom Prison was certified triple platinum by the RIAA for shipping over three million units. Since its release, it has been acknowledged as one of the greatest albums of all time by several sources. In 2003, the album was ranked number 88 on Rolling Stone list of the 500 greatest albums of all time, maintaining the rating in a 2012 revised list, ranking at number 164 in a 2020 revised list. Also in 2003, it was one of 50 recordings chosen by the Library of Congress to be added to the National Recording Registry. Country Music Television named it the third greatest album in country music in 2006. Blender listed the album as the 63rd greatest American album of all time and as one of the "500 CDs You Must Own". In 2006, Time listed it among the 100 greatest albums of all time. Guitar World and Far Out magazines both rated it as the best live album of all time. The album was also included in the book 1001 Albums You Must Hear Before You Die.

In 2008, Columbia and Legacy Records re-issued At Folsom Prison as a two CD, one DVD set. This so-called "Legacy Edition" contained both concerts uncut and remastered. The included DVD, produced by Bestor Cram and Michael Streissguth of Northern Light Productions, featured pictures and interviews relevant to the concert. Pitchfork Media lauded the collection, claiming that it had "the force of empathic endeavors, as if he were doing penance for his notorious bad habits". Christian Hoard wrote for Rolling Stone that the Legacy edition "makes for an excellent historical document, highlighting Cash's rapport with prison folk".

Track listing

Re-release (1999)

Legacy Edition (2008)

Personnel
Johnny Cash – vocals, guitar, harmonica
June Carter – vocal
Marshall Grant – bass guitar
W.S. Holland – drums
Carl Perkins – electric guitar, vocals on track 2.
Luther Perkins – electric guitar
The Statler Brothers (Lew DeWitt, Don Reid, Harold Reid, Phil Balsley) – vocals
Bob Johnston – producer
Bob Breault – engineer
Bill Britain – engineer
Jim Marshall – photography

Credited on 1999 re-issue
Bob Irwin – producer
Steven Berkowitz – producer, A&R
Vic Aneseni – mixing
Howard Fritzson – art direction
Darcy Proper – mastering
Frank Tozour – PQ editing
John Henry Jackson – product manager
Randall Martin – packaging manager
Darren Salmieri – A&R
Tim Smith – A&R
Nick Shaffran – consultant

Charts

Certifications

Citations

References

Further reading

Geary, Daniel. The Way I Would Feel About San Quentin': Johnny Cash and the Politics of Country Music". Daedalus. 142 (Fall 2013). 64–72.   

1968 live albums
2008 video albums
Albums produced by Bob Johnston
Columbia Records live albums
Columbia Records video albums
Johnny Cash live albums
Live video albums
Prison music
United States National Recording Registry recordings
United States National Recording Registry albums
Grammy Hall of Fame Award recipients